Lindsay J. Whaley is a professor of linguistics and classics at Dartmouth College

He received his bachelor's degree with honors from Calvin College in 1988. He went on to the State University of New York, where he earned his master's degree (1990) and PhD (1993).

Bibliography

External links
Faculty page of Lindsay J. Whaley

Living people
Linguists from the United States
Dartmouth College faculty
Year of birth missing (living people)